Potato cake is a name given to various shaped potato dishes around the world, including a patty of hashed potatoes, a fried patty of mashed potato, a fried and battered slice of potato, or a flatbread made with mashed potato and flour. In some states in Australia a thin slice of potato that is battered and deep fried may be called a potato scallop, potato cake or potato fritter.

Hashed potatoes

In parts of England and America, a potato cake is a patty of hashed potatoes, a kind of hash brown. These are available both fresh and frozen in supermarkets, and are served by many restaurants, such as fast food restaurants like  McDonald's and Whataburger, often as part of the breakfast menu. The term can also refer to a sort of potato pancake.

Mashed potatoes
Another variant popular in the United Kingdom is prepared from cold mashed potatoes and fresh eggs. The two ingredients are combined, then fried until crisp on the outside.

Potato scallops

In Australia and England, potato scallops are thin slices of potato that have been battered and deep-fried. The terminology used in Australia differs from state to state. In Victoria, Tasmania, and the Murray River regions of New South Wales, they are referred to as potato cakes.  In the eastern and northern regions of New South Wales, Queensland, and the Australian Capital Territory, they are "potato scallops" or simply "scallops" (and to avoid confusion, scallops eaten as seafood may be known as "sea scallops"). In South Australia and in New Zealand, potato fritter is most common, while in Western Australia and Northern Territory it is a mixed bag as to which term is used.

Potato scallops are typically called "scollops" in northern and central England, and "fritters" in other areas. This variant is normally a thin slice of potato, dipped in batter and deep fried, with no additional flavouring added except salt and vinegar.  This type of "potato scallop" is also found in New Zealand fish and chip shops, however there it is referred to as a potato fritter, not scallop. More commonly in New Zealand, a potato scallop is made from either mashed or grated potato and is not covered in batter or deep fried. Hash browns, which are also widely available, are distinctly different. In Scotland thin slices of potato covered in beer batter are known as potato fritters and commonly sold in chip shops. When sold in fish and chip shops, they are often bought in place of chips and may be served in a soft bread roll as a scallop butty. 

The term may refer to a preparation of mashed potatoes baked in the form of pie or a scallop made using potatoes or potato flour.

In U.S. fairs, they are known as battered potatoes.

Irish potato cakes (potato bread)

Irish potato bread is typically made from mashed potato, and either flour or baking soda, and is usually fried.  This is not the same dish as boxty; boxty is made using raw potatoes, whereas potato bread is made using cooked potatoes. In Ireland, potato bread is served in traditional breakfasts along with soda bread and toast.

Tattie scones

Scottish tattie scones and Lancashire potato cakes are made from mashed or reconstituted potato and flour, and baked on a griddle.  They are typically served fried with a full Scottish or English breakfast.

Aloo paratha
Aloo paratha ( "potato paratha") is a bread dish from the Indian subcontinent. It is a breakfast dish originated from the Punjab region. The recipe is one of the most popular breakfast dishes throughout the western, central and northern regions of India as well as the eastern regions of Pakistan. Aloo parathas consist of unleavened dough rolled with a mixture of mashed potato and spices, which is cooked on a hot tawa with butter or ghee. Aloo paratha is usually served with butter, chutney,  or Indian pickles in different parts of northern and western India.

See also

Lefse
 List of potato dishes
Potato pancake
Tater tots

References

Potato dishes
Australian cuisine
English cuisine
New Zealand cuisine
Fast food
Irish cuisine
Scottish cuisine
Potato_pancakes